Jintang Bridge is a highway bridge with a cable-stayed bridge portion, built in Zhejiang, China on the Zhoushan Archipelago, the largest offshore island group in China. It is the longest bridge in Zhoushan Trans-oceanic Bridges with a length of 26,540 meters, connecting Jintang Island and Zhenhai, Ningbo. The main span of the bridge is a cable-stayed bridge with opposite towers.

See also
Zhoushan Trans-oceanic Bridges
Xihoumen Bridge

External links
Main Navigable Passage Pier of Cross-Sea Bridge Completed 
Zhoushan Cross-sea Bridge Took Shape

Bridges completed in 2009
Cable-stayed bridges in China
Yangtze River Delta
Bridges in Zhoushan
Bridges in Ningbo
Toll bridges in China
Cross-sea bridges in China